= Kathryn Viviano =

American lawyer

- Born: Macomb County, Michigan
- Education: Hillsdale College
- Occupation: Judge

Kathryn Viviano is the head judge of the divorce division of the 16th Circuit Court (Macomb County) of Michigan. Viviano was first elected to the court in 2010.

Vivano has a bachelor's degree from Hillsdale College, and an MBA and JD from Wayne State University. She worked with the law firm of Barris, Sott, Denn & Driker before becoming a judge.

Viviano was born and raised in Macomb County, Michigan. Before becoming a lawyer she was operations manager for her family flower shop. She was an immigration attorney.
